Kenyatta is an African masculine given name meaning "musician", and may refer to:
 Kenyatta A.C. Hinkle (born 1987), American artist
 Kenyatta Johnson (21st century), American politician
 Kenyatta Jones (born 1979), American football offensive tackle
 Kenyatta Walker (born 1979), American football offensive tackle
 Kenyatta Wright (born 1978), American football linebacker

See also
 Kenyatta (surname)
 Kenyatta (disambiguation)

Given names
Masculine given names